Kizilovo is a rural locality in Polevskoy Selsoviet Rural Settlement, Kursky District, Kursk Oblast, Russia. Population:

Geography 
The village is located on the Polnaya River (a left tributary of the Seym), 97 km from the Russia–Ukraine border, 26 km south-east of the district center – the town Kursk, 4 km from the selsoviet center – Polevaya.

 Streets
There are the following streets in the locality: Lugovaya and Shkolnaya (178 houses).

 Climate
Kizilovo has a warm-summer humid continental climate (Dfb in the Köppen climate classification).

Transport 
Kizilovo is located 13 km from the federal route  (Kursk – Voronezh –  "Kaspy" Highway; a part of the European route ), 3.5 km from the road of regional importance  (Kursk – Bolshoye Shumakovo – Polevaya via Lebyazhye), on the road of intermunicipal significance  (Polevaya – Kizilovo), 3.5 km from the nearest railway halt Gutorovo (railway line Klyukva — Belgorod).

The rural locality is situated 27 km from Kursk Vostochny Airport, 101 km from Belgorod International Airport and 189 km from Voronezh Peter the Great Airport.

References

Notes

Sources

Rural localities in Kursky District, Kursk Oblast